

The American Air Jet American is an American homebuilt tip jet helicopter designed and built by American Air Jet of Woodland Park, Colorado for amateur construction from kits.

Design and development
The American is either a tandem two-seat or single seat helicopter first flown in July 1988. It has an aluminium alloy enclosed cockpit with a twin skid landing gear and non-moving tail surfaces. The American has a twin-blade single rotor made from glassfibre and no tail rotor, on the prototype a  Wankel rotary engine drives a centrifugal compressor that provides air to thrust jets on the tips of the blades.

Specifications (Prototype)

See also

References

Notes

Bibliography

1990s United States civil utility aircraft
Homebuilt aircraft
1980s United States helicopters